A catalytic heater is a flameless heater which relies on catalyzed chemical reactions to break down molecules and produce califaction (heat).  When the catalyst, natural gas, and oxygen combine together they ignite at a low enough temperatures that a flame is not needed. This process keeps repeating itself until either oxygen or the fuel source is taken out of the equation.

Types 
There are three main types of larger catalytic heaters:

 Heated Enclosure Packages
 Instrument Gas and Pilot Preheating Regulators
 Space Heating

Heated enclosure packages are used to protect pipes from rain and ice build-up by keeping the pipes heated.  The catalytic heater is contained within the package which is usually made out of stainless-steel. Instrument gas and pilot preheating regulators are only used for freeze protection, and to heat up the gas before it reaches the pilot. It can also be used to heat a stream of gas that's used for measurement or instrumentation. Space heating is a good substitution when heat is required but traditional means, such as electricity or safety concerns over explosive gas, can't be used. Catalytic space heaters generate infrared heat to raise the temperature in a given area.

In addition to the larger catalytic heaters there are also small hand warmer or pocket heaters that use a catalyst combustion unit. Current units use a glass fiber substrate coated with platinum. Cheaper units may use other catalysts that don't work as well. Some older units used asbestos substrates. These hand warmers are for people who work or pursue leisure activities outdoors in very low temperatures, especially those that require manual dexterity that is not possible while wearing thick gloves or mittens. They date from the foundation of the Japanese Hakkunin company by Niichi Matoba, who founded to produce a hand warmer 'Hakkin Kairo' based on his Japanese patent of 1923. John W. Smith, President of Aladdin Laboratories, Inc. of Minneapolis was awarded a US patent for a product called the Jon-e (pronounced “Johnny”) catalytic hand warmer on December 25, 1951. Production peaked in the fifties and sixties, at 10,000 warmers a day. Aladdin went out of business in the 1970s. In 2010 the Zippo lighter company introduced an all-metal catalytic hand warmer, along with other outdoor products. There are other catalytic hand warmer brands like the South Korean S-Boston, the UK Whitby Warmer and also Chinese unbranded versions of designs based on the Hakkin 'Peacock' or the 'Jon-e' which date back to the manufacturing heyday of Hong Kong in the 1960s and 70s.

Functions

Catalytic heaters serve many functions, especially in the oil and gas industries.  They are useful where heat production is necessary at a controlled rate. They can be used in gas meters, regulators and control valves, gas wellhead heaters, pipeline heaters, space heaters, and separators. They can also be used at the gate and compressor stations. Some other examples would include soldering irons, hand warmers, and space-heating appliances. Catalytic heaters have high efficiency allowing smaller heaters to be used, therefore lowering initial costs and fuel consumption. These heaters typically use propane (LP) or butane fuel, whereas many older types use either liquid fuel or alcohol. Handheld catalytic hand warmers have traditionally only used naphtha-type liquid fuel.

Safety
Certain safety measures should be taken when using a catalytic heater. Catalytic heaters should be installed properly to prevent fuel leakage because inhaling excessive amounts of natural gas can cause severe side effects. These heaters should all be placed in areas with good ventilation to help prevent this from happening. The user should be aware of carbon monoxide poisoning and its symptoms.  As catalytic heaters are completely flameless, this takes away any inherent fire risk. These heaters have also been found to be non-incendiary when exposed to flammable gasses directly, although it can still happen on rare occasions. It's also advised not to leave catalytic heaters unattended for any amount of time due to malfunctions that could occur and to prevent it from being knocked over. It's also advised, for residential catalytic heaters, to turn them off while the user is asleep.

See also
 Chemical heating pad

External links

References

Heaters